Seogwipo is the second-largest city on Jeju Island, settled on a rocky volcanic coastline in the southern part of Jeju Province, South Korea. In July 2006, Seogwipo's boundaries were expanded to include the entire southern half of Jeju island. A UNESCO World Heritage site and 2002 FIFA World Cup host, it had a population of 155,691 as of December 31, 2011.

History

Early history 
Hundreds of Seogwipo’s oldest archeological artifacts were found in Saengsugwe Cave near Cheonjiyeon Waterfall on the south coast of Jeju. After an extensive excavation by a team of experts from Jeju National Museum in November 2010, hundred of Stone Age artifacts were unearthed. Another ancient location in Seogwipo is the village of Hamo. Artifacts found there during a 2005 excavation include pieces of earthenware and shell mounds from the Neolithic Age.

In the beginning, Seogwipo was a part of Tamna, an ancient kingdom of Jeju. The kingdom traded with other nations across the Korean peninsula and China during the period of the Three Kingdoms (1st century BCE to 7th century CE). The small port of Seogwipo was used to send tributes to Yuan, an ancient kingdom in China. Tamna briefly reclaimed its independence after the fall of Silla in 935. However, it was subjugated by the Goryeo Dynasty in 938, and officially annexed in 1105. In 1300, among the 14 villages that made up Tamna Prefecture were Hongro and Yerye, two regions of modern Seogwipo. Tamna maintained local autonomy until 1404, when Taejo of the Joseon Dynasty placed it under firm central control. During the Joseon era, three fortresses were built in the Seogwipo area. In 1416, southern Jeju Island was divided into the prefectures of Jeongui and Daejeong. The former included Hongro, and the latter, Yerye, which had been the urban centers of Seogwipo City.

Modern history 
In 1914, during the period of Japanese colonial rule, Jeongui prefecture and Daejeong prefecture were merged into Jeju-gun (gun meaning an administrative district bigger than a prefecture), and the two centers of Seogwipo became Jeongui-myeon and Daejeong. In 1915 the names were changed a second time, to U township and Jwa township. In 1935 the two townships were given the names they still have today: Seogwi and Jungmun. Seogwipo was greatly affected by Japanese colonial rule - it was used as a base that supplied marine products, and a whale processing plant was built near the port of Seogwipo. Twelve artificial caves made by the Japanese army still remain along the coast near Sammaebong Peak.

After the end of the colonial period, Seogwipo felt the hardship of the 1948 Jeju uprising and its aftermath. When the Korean War broke out in 1950, Seogwipo port became crowded with thousands of refugees.

After the war, the island was rebuilt. As people's livelihoods stabilized, mandarin orange farming became the most profitable crop for the islanders. The Satsuma mandarin had been brought to Korea from Japan in 1911 by a Catholic missionary named Esmile J. Taque. Few farmers grew mandarins in the 1950s, and the mandarin orange commanded such high prices that mandarin tree was called daehaknamu, meaning "the source of money for college tuition". The government supported mandarin farming from the early 1960s and rapidly increased the number of farms. Now, mandarins from Jeju are a winter staple throughout South Korea.

In the meantime, Seogwipo's status as an administrative district improved. In 1946, the island became Jeju-do (province) and reorganized into Bukjeju-gun to the north of Mt. Halla and Namjeju-gun to the south, which Seogwi-myeon and Jungmun-myeon belonged to. After Jeju-eup (town) became Jeju-si (city) in 1955, Seogwi-myeon became Seogwi-eup in 1956 and was combined with Jungmun-myeon, which created Seogwipo-si and became independent from Namjeju-gun in 1981. In addition, a plan to reorganize the administrative district to combine Jeju-si and Bukjeju-gun, and Seogwipo-si and Namjeju-gun passed through the local referendum in 2005. As a result, Seogwipo City was expanded to cover Namjeju-gun in 2006 and the Jeju Special Self-Governing Province was established.

Modern Seogwipo City has changed remarkably since its days as a small village, and has renewed itself since Korean War. The Jungmun Tourism Complex is considered a premier Jeju tourist landmark. The Jeju World Cup Stadium welcomed thousands of visitors in 2002 during the South Korean/Japan World Cup. People from all over the world come to the International Convention Center Jeju in Jungmun for conventions. The Jeju Olle trails along the Seogwipo coast are most popular among hikers.

Tourism 

Seogwipo's atmosphere is similar to other Korean seaside towns - old love motels and old businesses. However, it also has lush gardens and citrus farms that are bordered with black rock fences. The whole town is small enough for people to walk across easily. The Olle Market in downtown Seogwipo is a traditional daily market. There is also much to see and eat along Lee Joong-seop Street, Myeongdong Road, Arang Joeul Street, and Chilsimni Food Street.

Tourist attractions

O’sulloc Museum 
The museum, which first opened in September 2001, is widely known in Korea. At the O’sulloc Museum, not only can visitor enjoy unique O’sulloc teas, but they can relax next to the lotus pond in the indoor garden. The second floor of the building has an observatory, so visitors can enjoy the views of the nearby green tea fields and the surrounding landscape.

Daeyoo Land 
Daeyoo Land opened in 1978 as a hunting ground and shooting range and recently opened an ATV (All-Terrain Vehicle) track. It includes a pistol range, rifle ranges, clay pigeon shooting, and an ATV track.

Cheonjiyeon Falls 
Cheonjiyeon, meaning "God’s pond", derives its name from the legend that the seven fairies serving the King of Heaven came down to the pond on stairs of cloud and bathed in its clean waters.

Jeongbang Waterfall 
Jeongbang Waterfall is the only waterfall in Asia that falls directly into the ocean. On the wall of the water fall, there is an inscription written “Seobulgwacha,” referring to Seobul passing by this place. Seobul was a servant of the Chinese Emperor Jin (BC 259~210) who was ordered by the Emperor to find the substance that would make him immortal. Seogwipo is also said to have gotten its name to mean Seobul headed back west.

Seongsan Ilchulbong Peak 
Seongsan Ilchulbong Peak rose from under the sea in a volcanic eruption over 100,000 years ago. There is a huge crater at the top of Seongsan Ilchulbong Peak.

Seogwipo Submarine Tour 
Seogwipo Submarine offers undersea tours in a submarine from Finland. Munseom, where the submarine travels, is home to coral reefs, schools of fish, and seaweed.

Climate
Seogwipo has a humid subtropical climate (Köppen: Cfa), similar to nearby Japan.

Sports

Seogwipo is the home city of K League 1 club Jeju United. Jeju United's home stadium is Jeju World Cup Stadium, located in the southern part of Seogwipo.

Sister cities
 – Kashima, Ibaraki, Japan (since November 2003)
Salinas California, United States (Since 2018)

See also
 List of cities in South Korea
 Branksome Hall Asia, a school located in Seogwipo.
 Yeomiji Botanical Garden

References

External links

Seogwipo Official site (in Korean)

 
Cities in Jeju Province
Port cities and towns in South Korea